Durham is an unincorporated community in Durham Township in Bucks County, Pennsylvania, United States. Durham is located at the intersection of Pennsylvania Route 212 and Durham Road.

References

Unincorporated communities in Bucks County, Pennsylvania
Unincorporated communities in Pennsylvania